The Cyrillic script family contains many specially treated two-letter combinations, or digraphs, but few of these are used in Slavic languages. In a few alphabets, trigraphs and even the occasional tetragraph or pentagraph are used.

As with the equivalent digraph in Greek, they were reduced to a typographic ligature, and are now written . In Church Slavonic printing practice, both historical and modern,  (which is considered as a letter from the alphabet's point of view) is mostly treated as two individual characters, but  is a single letter. In a context of Old Slavonic language,  is a digraph that can replace a letter  and vice versa.

Modern Slavic languages written in the Cyrillic alphabet make little or no use of digraphs. Sometimes these digraphs are even considered as special letters of their respective alphabets.

Cyrillic uses large numbers of digraphs only when used to write non-Slavic languages; in some languages such as Avar, these are completely regular in formation.

Since such sequences are decomposable, regular forms will not be listed below.

Archi
Archi: а́а , аӏ , а́ӏ , ааӏ , гв , гь , гъ , гъв , гъӏ , гъӏв , гӏ , е́е , еӏ , е́ӏ , жв , зв , и́и , иӏ , кк , кв , ккв , кӏ , кӏв , къ , къв , ккъ , къӏ , ккъӏ , къӏв , ккъӏв , кь , кьв , лъ , ллъ , лъв , ллъв , лӏ , лӏв , о́о , оӏ , о́ӏ , ооӏ , пп , пӏ , сс , св , тт , тӏ , тв , твӏ , у́у , уӏ , у́ӏ , хх , хв , ххв , хӏ , хьӏ , ххьӏ , хьӏв , ххьӏв , хъ , хъв , хъӏ , хъӏв , цв , цӏ , ццӏ , чв , чӏ , чӏв , шв , щв , ээ , эӏ

Avar
Avar uses  for labialization, as in хьв . Other digraphs are:
Ejective consonants in : кӏ , цӏ , чӏ 
Other consonants based on к : къ , кь ,
Based on г : гъ , гь , гӏ 
Based on л : лъ 
Based on х : хъ , хь , хӏ 

The ь digraphs are spelled this way even before vowels, as in   "made", not *гябуна.

Gemination: кк , кӏкӏ , хх , цц , цӏцӏ , чӏчӏ .
Note that three of these are tetragraphs. However, gemination for the 'strong' consonants in Avar orthography is sporadic, and the simple letters or digraphs are frequently used in their place.

Belarusian
The Belarusian language has the following digraphs: 
'дз' for affricates [d͡z] and [d͡zʲ] (see :uk:дз)
'дж' for affricates [d͡ʒ] and [d͡ʒ|ʲ] (see дж).

Chechen and Ingush
Chechen uses the following digraphs:
Vowels: аь , яь , оь , ёь , уь , юь 
Ejectives in : кӏ , пӏ , тӏ , цӏ , чӏ 
Other consonants: гӏ , кх , къ , хь , хӏ 
The trigraph рхӏ 

In Ingush, there are no ejectives, so for example кӏ is pronounced . Some of the other values are also different: аь  etc., уь  etc., кх  (vs. къ ), хь 

Kabardian
Other digraphs are:
Slavic дж , дз 
Ejectives in : кӏ  (but кӏу is ), лӏ , пӏ , тӏ , фӏ , цӏ , щӏ 
Other consonants: гъ , жь , къ , лъ  (from л ), хь , хъ 
The trigraph кхъ 
Labialized, the trigraph becomes the unusual tetragraph кхъу .

Tabasaran
Tabasaran uses gemination for its 'strong' consonants, but this has a different value with г.

Front vowels: аь , уь 
Gemination for 'strong' consonants: кк , пп , тт , цц , чч 
Ejectives with : кӏ , пӏ , тӏ , цӏ , чӏ 
Based on г : гг , гъ , гь 
Other consonants based on к : къ , кь ,
Based on х : хъ , хь 

It uses  for labialization of its postalveolar consonants: шв , жв , чв , джь , ь , ччь ).

Tatar
Tatar has a number of vowels which are written with ambiguous letters that are normally resolved by context, but which are resolved by discontinuous digraphs when context is not sufficient. These ambiguous vowel letters are е, front  or back , ю, front  or back ; and я, front  or back . They interact with the ambiguous consonant letters к, velar  or uvular , and г, velar  or uvular .

In general, velar consonants occur before front vowels and uvular consonants before back vowels, so it is frequently not necessary to specify these values in the orthography. However, this is not always the case. A uvular followed by a front vowel, as in  "kinsman", for example, is written with the corresponding back vowel to specify the uvular value: кардәш. The front value of а is required by vowel harmony with the following front vowel ә, so this spelling is unambiguous.

If, however, the proper value of the vowel is not recoverable through vowel harmony, then the letter ь  is added at the end of the syllable, as in   "poet". This strategy is also followed with the ambiguous letters е, ю, and я in final syllables, for instance in   cheap. That is, the discontinuous digraphs е...ь, ю...ь, я...ь are used for  plus the front vowels .

Exceptional final-syllable velars and uvulars, however, are written with simple digraphs, with ь for velars and ъ for uvulars:   pure,   promise.

Ukrainian
The Ukrainian language has the following digraphs: 
'ьо', for [ʲɔ] and [ʲo] (see :uk:Ьо) 
'дз' for affricates [d͡z] and [d͡zʲ] (see :uk:дз)
'дж' for affricates [d͡ʒ] and [d͡ʒ|ʲ] (see дж).

Other alphabets
Dungan
ан (ян) , он , эр , etc.

Mandarin Chinese
In the Cyrillization of Mandarin, there are digraphs цз and чж, which correspond to Pinyin z/j and zh. Final n is нь, while н stands for final ng. юй is yu, but ю you, ю- yu-, -уй -ui.

Karachay-Balkar
гъ , дж , къ , нг~нъ . Нг  is also found in Uzbek.

Khanty
л’ , ч’ 

Lezgian
гъ, гь, къ, кь, кӏ, пӏ, тӏ, уь, хъ, хь, цӏ, чӏ

Ossetian
Slavic дж , дз 
Ejectives in : къ , пъ , тъ , цъ , чъ 
гъ , хъ 

Komi

Turkmen (now using Latin alphabet)
Long үй , from ү .

Yakut
дь , нь

See also
Languages using Cyrillic
List of Cyrillic letters
Bigram
Diacritic
Diphthong
Typographic ligature

 
Orthography
Digraphs (orthography)